The NRE 2GS36C-DE is a low-emissions six-axle diesel-electric road switcher locomotive built by National Railway Equipment Company. It is part of NRE's N-ViroMotive line. It offers Tier III emissions compliance.
 
The first demonstration unit was released in August 2011 from NRE's Mount Vernon shops in Southern Illinois. It was built on a refurbished EMD SD40-2 frame.

Original Buyers

References

External links

 National Railway Equipment – Official NRE Website
 National Railway Equipment  – Official N-ViroMotive Product Page
 Train Web.Org - Genset Locomotive Rosters – Information and resource site for low-emission switcher locomotives built by National Railway Equipment.

C-C locomotives
NRE locomotives
Railway locomotives introduced in 2011
Diesel-electric locomotives of the United States
EPA Tier 3-compliant locomotives of the United States
Rebuilt locomotives
Standard gauge locomotives of the United States
Unique locomotives